1337x is a website that provides a directory of torrent files and magnet links used for peer-to-peer file sharing through the BitTorrent protocol. According to the TorrentFreak news blog, 1337x is the third most popular torrent website as of 2021.

History 
1337x was founded in 2007 and saw increasing popularity in 2016 after the closure of KickassTorrents. In October 2016, it introduced a website redesign with new functionalities. The site is banned from Google search queries and does not appear when searching through Google search. This action was taken following a request by Feelgood Entertainment in 2015. In 2015, the site moved from its older .pl domain to .to, partly in order to evade the block.

1337x's design can be compared to the now defunct h33t. It has been touted as an alternative to the Pirate Bay in face of its potential demise.

See also 
Comparison of BitTorrent sites
Digital piracy
Leet

References

External links 
 

BitTorrent
BitTorrent websites
Web directories